Tongren South railway station (formerly Yuping East railway station) is a railway station on the Changsha–Kunming section of the Shanghai–Kunming High-Speed Railway. It is located in Yuping Dong Autonomous County, Tongren, Guizhou, People's Republic of China.

References

Railway stations in Guizhou